The Guhyasamāja Tantra (Sanskrit: Guhyasamājatantra; Tibetan: Gsang ’dus rtsa rgyud, Toh 442; Tantra of the Secret Society or Community), also known as the Tathāgataguhyaka (Secrets of the Tathagata), is one of the most important scriptures of Tantric Buddhism, written in Sanskrit. In its fullest form, it consists of seventeen chapters, though a separate "explanatory tantra" (vyākhyātantra) known as the Later Tantra (Sanskrit: Guhyasamāja Uttaratantra; Tibetan: Rgyud phyi ma. (Toh 443)) is sometimes considered to be its eighteenth chapter. Many scholars believe that the original core of the work consisted of the first twelve chapters, with chapters thirteen to seventeen being added later as explanatory material.

The Guhyasamāja-tantra is not to be confused with the Mahayana sutra titled Tathāgataguhyaka Sūtra.

In India, it was classified as a Yoga or Mahāyoga Tantra. In Tibet it is considered an Unexcelled Yoga Tantra (rnal ’byor bla med rgyud). It develops traditions found in earlier scriptures such as the Compendium of Reality (Sanskrit: Sarva-tathāgata-tattva-saṃgraha; De bzhin gshegs pa thams
cad kyi de kho na nyid bsdus pa (Toh 479)) but is focused to a greater extent on the antinomian aspects characteristic of the later Buddhist Tantras. Naropa and Aryadeva considered the Compendium of Reality to be a root tantra in relation to the Guhyasamaja Tantra. The Guhyasamaja Tantra survives in Sanskrit manuscripts and in Tibetan and Chinese translation.

The Guhyasiddhi of Padmavajra, a work associated with the Guhyasamaja tradition, prescribes acting as a Saiva guru and initiating members into Shaiva Siddhanta scriptures and mandalas. Due to the radical methodology of having sexual relations with many women, both beautification and warning statues or paintings were created. The beautified one is Yab-Yum, and the warning one is Citipati.

Origin
According to one tradition, the Guhyasamāja Tantra was taught for the first time by the Buddha in the form of Vajradhara to Indrabhuti the King of Oddiyana, also called King Dza.

As with most tantras, there are different traditions and transmissions. Perhaps the oldest surviving lineage is the Jñānapada Tradition (ye shes zhabs lugs), which goes back to Buddhaśrijñāna (late 8th century). The most important historically is the Ārya tradition (gsang 'dus 'phags lugs) which is based on commentaries attributed to Nāgārjuna, Āryadeva, and Candrakīrti.  'Gos Lotsawa Khug pa lhas btsas originated a transmission in Tibet, as did Marpa Lotsawa. The Sakya tradition received both transmissions. Tsongkhapa, founder of the Gelug tradition, considered the Esoteric Community to be the most important of the tantras and used the Ārya tradition as a template for interpreting all the other tantric traditions.

Iconography

There are two main commentarial traditions on the Guhyasamāja Tantra, the Ārya Tradition and the Jñānapada tradition.

In the practice of the Ārya Tradition, the central deity of the Guhyasamāja is blue-black Akṣobhyavajra, a form of Akṣobhya, one of the five tathāgathas (pañcatathāgata), sometimes called the dhyāni buddhas. Akṣobhyavajra holds a vajra and bell (ghanta) in his first two hands, and other hands hold the symbols of the four other tathāgathas: wheel of Vairocana and lotus of Amitābha in his rights, and gem of Ratnasambhava and sword of Amoghasiddhi in his lefts. The maṇḍala consists of thirty-two deities in all.

In the Jñānapada tradition, the central deity is yellow Mañjuvajra, a form of Maṇjuśrī, with nineteen deities in the mandala. Mañjuvajra has three faces—the right one is white and red one on the left—and six arms. The three faces may represent the three main channels of the subtle body, the three stages of purification of the mind or the illusory body, light, and their union.  Mañjuvajra holds in his hands a sword and a book, and two of his other hand a bow and arrow represent skillful means (upāya).

See also
Vajrayana
Dakinis

References

Further reading
Guhyasamaja Practice in the Arya Nagarjuna System, Volume One, Shambhala Publications, 2019, 
 
 Wedemeyer, Christian K. 2007. Āryadeva's Lamp that Integrates the Practices: The Gradual Path of Vajrayāna Buddhism according to the Esoteric Community Noble Tradition. New York: AIBS/Columbia University Press. 
 Geshe Tashi Tsering p. 78 of 240 July 3, 2012. Tantra: The Foundation of Buddhist Thought Volume 6. London: Wisdom Publications.   
Brilliant Illumination of the Lamp of the Five Stages, Columbia University Press, 2011, 
A Lamp to Illuminate the Five Stages, Library of Tibetan Classics, 2013,

External links
 StudyBuddhism.com, What Is Guhyasamaja Practice?
 Encyclopædia Britannica, Guhyasamāja-tantra
 Tsongkhapa, A Lamp to Illuminate the Five Stages, Introduction, chapter 1, chapter 2

Tibetan Buddhist practices
Buddhist tantras
Sanskrit books